Lawrence Joseph Riley (September 6, 1914 – December 2, 2001) was a Roman Catholic bishop.

Born in Boston, Massachusetts, Riley was ordained to the priesthood on September 21, 1940, for the Roman Catholic Archdiocese of Boston. On December 7, 1971, he was appointed titular bishop of Daimlaig and auxiliary bishop of the Boston Archbishop and was ordained on February 2, 1972. Riley retired on January 22, 1990.

Notes

1914 births
2001 deaths
Clergy from Boston
20th-century American Roman Catholic titular bishops
Roman Catholic Archdiocese of Boston
American Roman Catholic clergy of Irish descent